Embassy was a weekly Canadian foreign policy magazine. Founded in 2004, it covered defence, foreign policy, development and aid, trade and security news and opinion from a Canadian perspective. The Embassy offices were in Ottawa, Ontario. In March 2016 it was absorbed into the Hill Times.

References

External links

2004 establishments in Ontario
2016 disestablishments in Ontario
News magazines published in Canada
Weekly magazines published in Canada
Defunct magazines published in Canada
Magazines established in 2004
Magazines disestablished in 2016
Magazines published in Ottawa